USS Dominant is a name used more than once by the U.S. Navy:

 , was a coastal minesweeper laid down 9 April 1941 and struck from the Navy List on 1 May 1946.
 , was a fleet minesweeper launched 5 November 1953 and decommissioned 1 October 1982.

United States Navy ship names